A nullah or nala (Hindustani or "nallah" in Punjabi) is an 'arm of the sea', stream, or watercourse, a steep narrow valley. Like the wadi of the Arabs, the nullah is characteristic of mountainous or hilly country where there is little rainfall.

In the drier parts of India and Pakistan, and in many parts of Australia, there are small steep-sided valleys penetrating the hills, clothed with rough brushwood or small trees growing in the stony soil. During occasional heavy rains, torrents rush down the nullahs and quickly disappear. There is little local action upon the sides, while the bed is lowered, and consequently these valleys are narrow and steep.

Encroachment into nullahs is a significant problem in many South Asian cities, since it hampers the drainage of stormwater and can exacerbate floods.

Canal
In  East Asia, a nullah refers to an open, usually concrete-lined channel designed to allow rapid drainage of stormwater or industrial wastewater from high ground, to prevent flooding or stagnation in urbanised coastal areas, and basically is an often dry canal used as a reserve drain. One such example is the Kai Tak Nullah in Hong Kong.

References

Attribution

Valleys
Hindi words and phrases
Geography of India
Indian English idioms
Water in India
Urdu-language words and phrases